In chess, doubled pawns are two pawns of the same color residing on the same file. Pawns can become doubled only when one pawn captures onto a file on which another friendly pawn resides. In the diagram, the white pawns on the b-file and e-file are doubled.

In most cases, doubled pawns are considered a weakness due to their inability to defend each other. This inability, in turn, makes it more difficult to achieve a breakthrough which could create a passed pawn (often a deciding factor in endgames). In the case of isolated doubled pawns, these problems are only further aggravated. Several chess strategies and openings are based on burdening the opponent with doubled pawns, a strategic weakness.

There are, however, cases where accepting doubled pawns can be advantageous because doing so may open up a file for a rook, or because the doubled pawns perform a useful function, such as defending important squares. Also, if the opponent is unable to effectively attack the pawns, their inherent weakness may be of little or no consequence. There are also a number of openings that accept doubled pawns in exchange for some prevailing advantage, such as the Two Knights Variation of Alekhine's Defence.

Tripled and quadrupled pawns

It is possible to have tripled pawns (or more). Tripled pawns are sometimes referred to as an Irish Pawn Center. The diagram shows a position from Lubomir Kavalek–Bobby Fischer, Sousse Interzonal 1967.  The pawns remained tripled at the end of the game on move 28 (a draw).

Quadrupled pawns occurred in the game Alexander Alekhine–Vladimir Nenarokov, 1907, in John van der Wiel–Vlastimil Hort, 1981, and in other games.  The longest lasting case of quadrupled pawns was in the game Kovacs–Barth, Balatonbereny 1994, lasting 23 moves.  The final position was drawn, demonstrating the weakness of the extra pawns (see diagram).

Types of doubled pawns

There are different types of doubled pawns (see diagram).  A doubled pawn is weak because of four considerations:
 lack of mobility
 inability to act as a normal pawn
 likelihood that it cannot be exchanged for an opposing normal pawn
 vulnerability to attack, as the front pawn cannot be defended from behind by a rook
The doubled pawns on the b-file are in the best situation, the f-file pawns are next.  The h-file pawns are in the worst situation because two pawns are held back by one opposing pawn, so the second pawn has little value .  See Chess piece relative value for more discussion.

See also
Passed pawn
Pawn structure
Isolated pawn
Backward pawn
Connected pawns

References

Bibliography
 
 

Chess terminology
Chess strategy